Brachyopa atlantea is a European species of hoverflies.

Distribution
Spain.

References

Diptera of Europe
Eristalinae
Insects described in 2000